Archdale Palmer (1865–1950) was a British tennis player in the early years of Wimbledon.  Palmer became Secretary of the All England Lawn Tennis Club in 1899 and was appointed managing director of Slazenger in 1905. His position at Slazenger was considered a conflict of interest by the A.E.L.T. C. (Slazenger manufactured the balls used at Wimbledon).  Palmer resigned as Secretary in 1906. Palmer lost his opening match at Wimbledon 1892 to Harry Barlow. He reached the Wimbledon semifinals in 1893, losing to Harold Mahony. In 1894 he lost his opening match at Wimbledon to Herbert Baddeley. In 1893 Palmer won the Dinard men's singles title beating Arthur Gore in the Challenge Round in five sets. Palmer also played real tennis.  He was Captain in the Essex Regiment in World War 1.

References

1865 births
1950 deaths
19th-century male tennis players
English male tennis players
British male tennis players
Tennis people from Essex
British Army personnel of World War I
Essex Regiment officers
Military personnel from Essex